The Goodlife Recipe was a brand name of cat food manufactured in the United States by Mars, Incorporated. The brand debuted in 2007 with cat food and dog food, however, their dog food and dog treat lines were discontinued in August 2010 for economic reasons and cat food in June/July 2018. After years of introduction, the famous "thought pyramid" design came into use.

Packaging
The product's  multiwall paper bag incorporating a slider zipper won an AmeriStar award from the Institute of Packaging Professionals.

Promotion
As part of a promotional campaign, Jewel recorded a cover version of "The Good Life", a 1960s song popularized by Tony Bennett and Frank Sinatra.

References

External links
The Goodlife Recipe Official Website
How To Feed Two Cats With Different Eating Habits
What Determines How Much Wet Food To Feed Your Cat

Cat food brands
Dog food brands